Sebastian Goode (born c. 1599) was an English politician who sat in the House of Commons in 1625.

Goode was the son of John Goode of Malden, Surrey. He matriculated at Christ Church, Oxford on 19 May 1615, aged 16. He was a student of Lincoln's Inn in 1618. In 1625, he was elected Member of Parliament for Tregoney.

References

1599 births
Year of death missing
Members of the pre-1707 English Parliament for constituencies in Cornwall
English MPs 1625